William Clyde "Chase" Elliott II (born November 28, 1995) is an American professional stock car racing driver. He competes full-time in the NASCAR Cup Series, driving the No. 9 Chevrolet Camaro ZL1 for Hendrick Motorsports and part-time in the NASCAR Craftsman Truck Series, driving the No. 35 Chevrolet Silverado for McAnally-Hilgemann Racing. He won the 2014 NASCAR Nationwide Series championship, becoming the first rookie to win a national series championship in NASCAR and the youngest champion in that series.

Elliott began racing in the Cup Series on a full-time basis in 2016, during which he was named the 2016 NASCAR Sprint Cup Series Rookie of the Year. In 2020, he won the Cup Series championship in Phoenix Arizona, the first for Hendrick Motorsports since 2016. He has 18 career wins in the Cup Series, including seven on road courses.

He is the son of 1988 Winston Cup Series champion Bill Elliott; the Elliotts are the third father-son NASCAR champions in history, along with Lee and Richard Petty and Ned and Dale Jarrett.

Racing career

Early career and short track racing

At the age of 13, Elliott was featured alongside thirteen other athletes, including future world number one golfer Jordan Spieth and future NBA 2nd overall pick Michael Kidd-Gilchrist, as potential stars in the July 13, 2009 issue of Sports Illustrated.
Elliott raced in 40 races in various series in 2010, winning twelve events over the course of the year and finishing in the top ten 38 times. It was the third season of his racing career, and he won the Blizzard Series, Miller Lite and Gulf Coast championship en route to being named the Georgia Asphalt Pro Late Model Series Rookie of the Year. He ended the season by winning the Winchester 400. Sports Illustrated named Elliott as the high school player of the week in April 2011. During the year, he competed in the Champion Racing Association, winning the series' National Super Late Model championship. Later that year, just after his sixteenth birthday, he won the Snowball Derby and became the race's youngest winner. He beat the second place driver, DJ Vanderley, by a record 0.229 seconds. In 2012, he won the Alan Turner Snowflake 100, prelude to the Snowball Derby, for the second time in three years.

In November 2013, Elliott won the All American 400, becoming the first driver to win all four of the country's largest short-track races: the All American 400, the Snowball Derby, the World Crown 300 and the Winchester 400.  In December, it appeared as though Elliott had become the first driver to sweep the Snowball Derby and Snowflake 100 in the same weekend. Upon post-race inspection, however, a piece of tungsten was found in Elliott's car, which was prohibited by the Derby rulebook. Elliott was accordingly disqualified and the victory awarded to Erik Jones. Elliott won the Snowball Derby in 2015 after initial winner Christopher Bell was disqualified.

Stock car touring series
Elliott signed a three-year driver development contract with Hendrick Motorsports in February 2011. He competed in the K&N Pro Series East in 2011 with number 9, finishing 9th in season points. Elliott returned to the K&N Pro Series East in 2012, winning his first career race in the series at Iowa Speedway in May. He finished fourth in series points.

In 2011 and 2012, Elliott competed in three K&N Pro Series West races (once in 2011, twice in 2012), all at Phoenix International Raceway. In his lone 2011 event, he finished third, and in the 2012 races, he finished 17th (due to a crash) and fourth.

Elliott competed in six ARCA Racing Series races in 2012 and five races in 2013 with number 9, in order to gain experience at larger circuits. ARCA allows 17-year old drivers to race at Pocono Raceway and Kentucky Speedway, two circuits where NASCAR has a minimum age of 18; the minimum age for ovals longer than 2,000 meters, or 1.25 miles, is 18 years of age; shorter tracks and road courses have a minimum age of 16. On June 8, 2013, Elliott became the youngest winner in ARCA superspeedway history following his Pocono victory.

NASCAR national series

Truck Series
In January 2013, it was announced that Elliott would compete in nine NASCAR Camping World Truck Series events for Hendrick Motorsports during the 2013 racing season, using trucks prepared by Turner Scott Motorsports.

Elliott would win his first race in the Chevrolet Silverado 250 at Canadian Tire Motorsport Park, in the first road course truck race outside the US; he was at the time the youngest winner in Truck Series history, at the age of 17 years, 9 months, and 4 days. The win was however controversial as Elliott made contact with leader Ty Dillon in the last corner. Dillon hit the tire barrier while Elliott went into the grass though recovered enough to be able to coast to the finish line ahead of Kyle Busch Motorsports driver Chad Hackenbracht.

Dillon afterwards stated that the next time they raced each other "he won't finish the race"; later Elliott stated he had attempted to apologize to Dillon but without any response. The following week at Iowa Speedway, Elliott cut down a tire early in the race and crashed without involvement from Dillon.

In October 2016, Elliott entered the Alpha Energy Solutions 200 at Martinsville Speedway, his first truck race since 2013, driving the No. 71 for Contreras Motorsports, leasing owners points and the truck chassis from JR Motorsports, where he led the most laps with 109 and finished 2nd.

Elliott joined GMS Racing's No. 23 entry for two races (Atlanta and Martinsville) in 2017, and he won at Martinsville. Three years later, he returned to the series and team in the No. 24; the effort was spawned from Kevin Harvick offering a bounty to full-time Cup drivers able to beat Kyle Busch. The attempt was initially scheduled for the Atlanta race before being moved to Charlotte in May due to the COVID-19 pandemic's impact on the schedule. Elliott ultimately won the race ahead of Busch to claim the bounty; tensions had been high between the two following an incident earlier in the season.

In 2021, Elliott once again raced in the truck series racing for GMS Racing at Texas Motor Speedway.

In 2022, Elliott drove the #7 for Spire Motorsports in the Bristol Dirt event.

In 2023, Elliott took control of the No. 35 Chevy Silverado RST race truck for McAnally Hilgemann Racing for the season-opening race at Daytona International Speedway on Friday, February 17, 2023. Elliott finished tenth in the race, which was shortened due to rain after 79 of a scheduled 100 laps.

Xfinity Series

In January 2014, it was announced that Elliott would be competing full-time in the Nationwide Series in 2014, driving the No. 9 Chevrolet for JR Motorsports, with sponsorship from NAPA Auto Parts. On April 4, 2014, Elliott won the O'Reilly Auto Parts 300 at Texas Motor Speedway, holding Kevin Harvick and Kyle Busch off after taking the lead with 16 laps to go. On April 11, 2014, Elliott won the VFW Sport Clips Help a Hero 200 at Darlington Raceway by passing Elliott Sadler on the last lap after restarting sixth with two laps to go. Elliott won the EnjoyIllinois.com 300 at Chicagoland Speedway after holding off Trevor Bayne. At Phoenix, Elliott clinched the Nationwide Series championship with a 53-point lead over teammate Regan Smith, becoming the first rookie and youngest driver to win a NASCAR national series title. Later in the year, he was named the Nationwide Series' Most Popular Driver.

In 2015, Elliott received his first DNF in his career after being involved in the second big one at Daytona, finishing 28th. On September 11, Elliott won his first race of the season at Richmond, snapping his 36-race winless streak. He battled with Chris Buescher for the championship, but was unable to catch up and finished 2nd in points.

Following Elliott's move up to the Cup Series in 2016, he continued driving for JR Motorsports part-time in the Xfinity Series. In 2016, he drove the No. 88 car in 5 races, including the season-opening PowerShares QQQ 300 at Daytona, which he won. He also drove the No. 5 car in Texas.

In 2018, he began the season driving the No. 88 car at Daytona, which teammate Tyler Reddick won in a photo finish with teammate Elliott Sadler. Following Spencer Gallagher's suspension from NASCAR, it was announced that Elliott would pilot the No. 23 car for GMS Racing in select events, including the races at Charlotte, Pocono, Chicagoland, Daytona, and Bristol.

In 2021, Chase would sub out for Michael Annett at the Indianapolis Motor Speedway road course.

In 2022, surprisingly, he DNQed for the Darlington Spring event due to the cancellation of qualifying due to rain.

Cup Series
On January 29, 2015, Hendrick Motorsports announced Elliott would make his Sprint Cup Series debut in 2015, driving the No. 25 with Kenny Francis as crew chief. He was scheduled to race in five races at Martinsville, Richmond, Charlotte, Indianapolis, and Darlington. The team also announced that he would take over Jeff Gordon's No. 24 starting in 2016.

Elliott's Cup debut in the STP 500 was threatened by potential rain; due to a lack of owner's points and race attempts, had qualifying been rained out, he would have failed to qualify. During the race, contact with Brett Moffitt on lap 75 forced his car to drop debris onto the track and damage to hang from its rear, while his power steering was damaged. Dropping to 37th, Elliott entered the garage, and returned to the race on lap 144, 69 laps behind the leader and in last. Elliott would ultimately finish 38th, 73 laps down. On May 5, 2015, it was announced that Elliott would be entering the Sprint All-Star Race's Sprint Showdown. He finished 8th and 5th in the event's two segments.

2016: Rookie Season

Elliott joined the Sprint Cup Series full-time in 2016, driving the No. 24 with Alan Gustafson as crew chief. Elliott carried primary sponsorship from NAPA Auto Parts (twenty-four races), 3M (five races), SunEnergy1 (four races), Kelley Blue Book (two races), and Mountain Dew (two races). He won the 2016 Rookie of the Year over Ryan Blaney, Chris Buescher, Jeffrey Earnhardt, and Brian Scott.

At the age of 20, he became the youngest pole-sitter in 500 history. Elliott led three laps in the race, but on lap 18, spun exiting turn four and slid into the grass, damaging the front of the car. Elliott returned to the race on lap 59, 40 laps down, and finished 37th. The next week he finished 8th at Atlanta for his first Sprint Cup top-ten finish. The following week, in Las Vegas, Elliott showed a strong car all day and even had his car inside the top-five with 40 laps to go, but crashed and finished 38th. Elliott picked up more top tens during the spring, finishing 5th at Texas for his first career Top-5, 4th at Bristol, 5th at Talladega, 9th at Kansas, 3rd at Dover, 8th in the Coca-Cola 600, and a career best 2nd at Michigan. At Pocono for the running of the Axalta "We Paint Winners" 400, Elliott would have his breakout race of his Sprint Cup career, Elliott would start 13th and later get the lead in the race and he would lead a race high of 51 laps, leading the most laps in a Sprint Cup race for the first time in his career. On a restart, Elliott would lose the lead and the race came down to fuel mileage but the fuel would hold and he would finish 4th. At Michigan in June, Elliott finished second after he missed a shift in the lead. He won the fan vote to advance into the All-Star Race along with Danica Patrick where he finished a respectable 7th after nearly winning the final segment of the Sprint Showdown, losing to Kyle Larson in a photo finish. Fifteen races into his rookie season, he sat 6th in the standings, the highest without a victory, with two poles for the Daytona 500 and at Talladega, six Top-5s and eleven Top-10s. Two weeks later at Sonoma, Elliott started 16th, but would ultimately finish 21st.

He was one of the first rookies to qualify for the Chase along with Chris Buescher since Denny Hamlin in 2006. On September 18, 2016, at the Teenage Mutant Ninja Turtles 400, he had a chance at his first win, but a late caution wiped out his 3-second lead over Martin Truex Jr., who would go on to win the race while Elliott would finish in 3rd. He was eliminated after the Round of 12 but managed to finish 10th in the final standings. Elliott Would Win The 2016 Rookie Of The Year Awards.

2017: Sophomore Season

Elliott started the 2017 season by winning the pole for the Daytona 500 for the second year in a row. He followed it up with a win in the first Can-Am Duel race, becoming the first driver since Dale Earnhardt in 1996 to win both the Daytona 500 pole and a qualifying race and the third in NASCAR history (Davey Allison is the first after doing so in 1990). At Martinsville a little later in the year, he sneaked past Kyle Busch after Ricky Stenhouse Jr. bumped the No. 18 out of the way, allowing Elliott to steal the stage 2 victory. At Talladega on May 7, he was involved in a 16 car pileup that nearly saw him flip over, as his car got airborne. At Michigan in June, Elliott got his 3rd second-place finish in a row at the track.

On October 1, 2017, Elliott had another chance at his first career win leading his first 138 laps at Dover and having a 4-second lead over Kyle Busch with 50 laps to go, but caught lap traffic and was stuck behind Ryan Newman, who has long held the reputation as one of the hardest guys to pass, allowing Busch to pass Elliott with two laps to go for the win while Elliott finished second. Jeff Gordon, the previous driver of the No. 24 car and a mentor to Elliott, confronted Newman after the race because he cost Elliott his first career win. At the fall race at Martinsville, Elliott was able to take the lead from Brad Keselowski with four to go, but his winning chances were ruined after being hit by Denny Hamlin from behind and spun out with three to go. Unhappy with Hamlin, he drove him to the outside wall after the race ended on the cooling lap. "My mom always said if you don’t have anything nice to say don’t say anything at all," Elliott told NBCSN. "He's not even worth my time. … We had a good opportunity. I can’t control his decisions and whatever the hell that was. On to Texas." He later got an apology from Hamlin after the race via Twitter.

At Phoenix, Elliott was in a must-win situation to advance to Miami. He did lead 34 laps of the race but once again, he had to settle for second as Matt Kenseth passed him with 10 laps to go, ending his championship hopes. However, he wound up finishing 5th in the final standings.

2018: First Cup Wins

In 2018, Hendrick Motorsports switched Elliott's car number from the No. 24 to the No. 9, the number that his father drove during most of his racing career, and also Chase's number in NASCAR's lower series. Elliott retained his crew, including crew chief Alan Gustafson.
In qualifying for the Daytona 500, Elliott posted the 9th fastest time, ending his streak of consecutive Daytona 500 poles at two. Only a few hours later in the Advance Auto Parts Clash, he would be upfront for most of the race, leading 17 out of the 75 laps but dropped back after an incident in the backstretch and was later caught up in a wreck on the final lap. Elliott won the second Can-Am Duel to earn a spot in the second row for the Daytona 500. Elliott ran towards the front during the first half of the Daytona 500, even leading four laps, before getting caught up in an accident on lap 102 and finishing 33rd.

At Richmond in April, Elliott finished second in the Toyota Owners 400. This was his best finish of the season to date and the eighth second-place finish of his career, tying the number of second-place finishes his father had before his first win. The following week at Talladega, he finished third in the GEICO 500 after starting the race at the rear of the field due to an unapproved tire change. Elliott had a strong race at Dover, starting 6th, finishing in the top 10 in both stages before slipping to 12th at the end. He scored another twelfth-place finish at Kansas, and rallied from a disappointing 22nd qualification to finish 11th at the Coca-Cola 600. Elliott had what he called his team's "best race of the year" to date in the Pocono 400 where he finished tenth and earned additional points with top tens in both stages. He scored a race-high 49 points with two top five stage finishes and a fourth-place overall finish in the Toyota/Save Mart 350 at Sonoma, which he considers "one of [his] worst" tracks.

He scored his first pole of the 2018 season at the Coke Zero Sugar 400 at Daytona, with a lap that was 0.240 seconds faster than anyone else in qualifying. The following day, his race ended early when he was collected in the “big one” on lap 54 along with 25 other drivers after Ricky Stenhouse Jr. turned Brad Keselowski near the front of the field, resulting in a 34th-place finish for Elliott. At Watkins Glen, Elliott started third, won Stage 2 for the third week in a row (Loudon, Pocono, Watkins Glen), and led the final 33 laps to finally capture his first career Monster Cup Series Series victory. Chase's win emulated his father, Bill, by finishing second eight times before winning, winning his first race on a road course, getting Hendrick Motorsports their 250th win, and becoming the youngest driver to win on a road course. (Bill won his first career race at the now-defunct Riverside International Raceway). Bill was also a spotter of Chase's for the race. He was notably given a push to the front stretch by teammate Jimmie Johnson when his car ran out of fuel when being congratulated by the rest of the drivers.

Elliott qualified for the 2018 playoffs. Elliott secured his second career victory on October 7, holding off Denny Hamlin in overtime at Dover. With the win, Elliott secured a spot in the third round. After a final lap melee at Talladega, he scored another win at Kansas later that month, holding off a hard-charging Kyle Busch late in the going. He made it through the Round of 8 until he was eliminated by a late crash with Denny Hamlin and Kurt Busch at Phoenix. Elliott finished the season sixth in the points standings.

2019: Continued Cup Series Success

Elliott started the 2019 season qualifying 18th for the 2019 Daytona 500. He spent majority of the race mid-pack before getting caught in a wreck on lap 200, finishing 17th. The following week at Atlanta, Elliott finished outside of the top 10 for the second race in a row after qualifying 22nd and finishing in 19th. However, at Las Vegas, Elliott got his first top 10 of the season after he finished ninth. At Martinsville, Elliott finished second after getting passed for the lead with 126 laps to go. He got his first win of the season at Talladega after a crash under the white flag caused the race to end under yellow. Elliott also defeated Martin Truex Jr. at Watkins Glen for the second year in a row. Elliott breezed past the first round of the playoffs with a fourth-place finish at Las Vegas and 13th at Richmond. At the Charlotte Roval, he was leading the field on lap 65 when he locked his brakes and collided with the turn 1 tire barrier. Despite the minimal damage on his front end, Elliott took advantage of several cautions to retake the lead on lap 104 before scoring his third win of the season and his sixth career victory. However, he finished 38th at Dover when he experienced an engine failure on the seventh lap. Elliott advanced to the Round of 8 after finishing second at Kansas, but once again failed to make the Championship 4 after crashing and finishing 39th at Phoenix.

2020: Cup Series Champion

The 2020 season began with a stage win and another 17th-place finish in the Daytona 500. The following week at Las Vegas saw him win the first two stages, but a flat tire on lap 220 caused him to spin into the turn one wall and finish 26th. He recorded top tens in the next three races, including winning the pole and leading a race-high 93 laps at Phoenix before brushing the wall late in the event to finish seventh.

Elliott would be plagued by late misfortunes during the ensuing races. With 28 laps left in the Toyota 500 at Darlington, Elliott was turned by Kyle Busch while running in second, leading to him giving the finger to Busch as he drove by. He would soon after beat Busch and receive a bounty from Kevin Harvick in a Truck race while tensions between the two were still high. In the next Cup race, the Coca-Cola 600 (the only Crown Jewel his father Bill had never won), Elliott was leading when Hendrick teammate William Byron's flat tire resulted in a caution and overtime. Elliott's team elected to pit before the restart, dropping him out of the lead; he eventually finished third before being promoted to second after fellow Hendrick driver Jimmie Johnson was disqualified. Elliott would rebound by winning the Alsco Uniforms 500 after passing Kevin Harvick for the lead with 27 laps to go. He was on the verge of a second consecutive race win at Bristol until he made contact with Joey Logano with three laps remaining, relegating him to 22nd and sparking a post-race discussion between the two.

In July, Elliott won the 2020 NASCAR All-Star Race at Bristol after winning two of the first three stages and dominating the final segment. The victory made the Elliotts the second father-son duo to win the All-Star Race, joining Dale Earnhardt and Dale Earnhardt Jr.; like Chase, Bill Elliott's 1986 race win came at a track beside the traditional host site Charlotte, doing so at Atlanta. A month later, during the inaugural Go Bowling 235 on the Daytona road course, Elliott led a race-high 34 laps en route to his second points-paying victory of the 2020 season and his third consecutive road course victory. The win put him in the lead for all-time winning percentage on road courses, with 36.36%.

In the first race of the playoffs, the Cook Out Southern 500, Elliott's car featured a throwback paint scheme honoring his teammate, mentor, and friend Jimmie Johnson. He was running up front for much of the race, and he was leading with less than 20 laps to go before Martin Truex Jr. attempted to pass him off of a run; the two made contact and both cars went into the wall, causing damage that set them back in speed and track position. Elliott decided not to pit but fell to 20th.

In the Bank of America Roval 400, Elliott had arguably the best car in the entire race as he started second, tied with teammate William Byron for most laps led, and won for his fourth straight road course victory. Winning this race made Elliott the youngest and oldest driver to win the Roval. Entering Martinsville's Xfinity 500, Elliott needed a win to advance to the final round; he worked his way to finish 4th in Stage 1, dominated to win Stage 2, and passed Martin Truex Jr. with 43 laps to go to win, which locked himself into the Championship Round at Phoenix.

Elliott started last in the Season Finale 500 after failing pre-race inspection twice, but ultimately led a race-high 153 laps to win the race and the championship. At the age of 24, he became the second-youngest driver to win a Cup championship. Along with his father, the Elliotts became third father-son duo to win titles following the Pettys (Lee and Richard) and the Jarretts (Ned and Dale).

2021: Quest to Defend The Title and Feud with Kevin Harvick

The early 2021 season was filled with highs and lows. After finishing 2nd in the Daytona 500, he was leading much of the following race at the Daytona Road Course before a caution for rain prompted him to pit and a spin with six laps remaining relegated him to 21st. In May, Elliott finally won his first race of the season in a rain delay at the inaugural race at the Circuit of the Americas. Elliott's victory achieved two milestones: the 268th Cup victory for Hendrick Motorsports, tying Petty Enterprises for the most Cup victories by a race team in NASCAR history, and Chevrolet's 800th Cup victory as a manufacturer. He finished 13th at the inaugural Ally 400 at Nashville, but was disqualified when his car had five loose lug nuts during post-race inspection. A few weeks later at Road America, Elliott would win again, beating Christopher Bell and Kyle Busch. At the Bristol Night Race Elliott Was embroiled in a feud with Kevin Harvick. Their feud carried over to the Charlotte Roval when Harvick wrecked Elliott. Afterwards Harvick's Crew told him that Elliott was behind him and he wrecked himself eliminating Harvick from the Playoffs.

At the Xfinity 500, Elliott swept both stages, securing enough points to clinch a spot in the NASCAR Cup Series Championship Race. In a battle against teammate Kyle Larson, and JGR drivers Denny Hamlin and Martin Truex Jr., Elliott finished 5th (lowest of all championship 4 contenders) and failed to repeat as a champion. Larson ended up winning the race and the title.

Elliott won Most Popular Driver for the fourth straight year.

2022: Regular Season Champion 

In February 2022, Elliott signed a 5-year extension with Hendrick Motorsports that will see him stay with the team until 2027.

The 2022 season for Chase Elliott started off with a 10th place finish in the Daytona 500, followed by a controversial 26th place finish at California after Hendrick Motorsports teammate and eventual winner Kyle Larson made contact with Chase in turn one, sending him into the wall. Following the incident, Chase collected 10 consecutive top 15 finishes, which included a 4th at the Circuit of the Americas road course in Austin, winning the pole and finishing 10th at Martinsville, getting his first win of the season at Dover, and getting a 5th place finish at Darlington. After Darlington, Chase hit a rough patch finishing 29th at Kansas after losing a tire late in the race, crashing out in the All-Star Race, leading 86 of the first 188 laps in the Coca-Cola 600 before getting caught up in a crash and failing to finish, and a 21st place finish at Gateway after contact with Ross Chastain.

After rebounding with an 8th place finish at Sonoma, Chase Elliott would go on a tear with 5 consecutive finishes of 1st or 2nd. Starting with his second win of the season at Nashville after leading 42 of 300 laps, Chase then looked to win his second consecutive race and back-to-back wins at Road America. He led more than half the race, leading 36 of the 62 laps, but had to settle for 2nd after getting passed by Tyler Reddick who would go on to capture his first win in the Cup series. Elliott followed up his 2nd place finish at Road America, with a win at his home track of Atlanta. Elliott dominated the race, winning both stages and leading 96 of the 260 laps, en route to his 3rd win of the season, and joining his father Bill Elliott in becoming only the second father-son tandem to win at Atlanta (joining Dale Earnhardt & Dale Earnhardt Jr.), and also joining his father in becoming the only two Georgia born racecar drivers to win at Atlanta Motor Speedway. Following the win at Atlanta, Elliott capped off a solid run at New Hampshire finishing 2nd. He was leading late in the race, but was passed by eventual winner Christopher Bell with 41 laps to go. Elliott would then follow up New Hampshire with a 3rd place finish at Pocono; However he would later be awarded as the winner, his 4th win of the season, when supposed winner Denny Hamlin and second place finisher Kyle Busch would be disqualified after their racecars failed post-race inspections.

Following a 5th place finish at Richmond, and a 4th place finish at Watkins Glen, Elliott was awarded the 2022 regular season championship, clinching the title with one race left in the regular season. In the final race of the regular season, Elliott started on the outside pole at Daytona. He led the most laps of the race, leading 31 of the 160 laps, but was caught up in a major crash when multiple cars were taken out due to rain. Elliott ended up finishing 29th.

At the Southern 500, Elliott finished 36th after a crash resulted in catastrophic rear suspension damage. Despite this, he rebounded to finish 11th at Kansas and runner-up to Chris Buescher at the Bristol Night Race to advance to the Round of 12. On October 2, Elliott won at Talladega to clinch a spot in the Round of 8, his second career victory at the track and series-high fifth win of the season; also equaling his career-best from his championship-winning season in 2020. He finished 28th at the Phoenix finale after being spun to the inside wall by Ross Chastain with 119 laps to go. As a result of the finish, Elliott finished fourth in the points standings.

2023: Leg injury
Elliott began the 2023 season with a 38th place finish at the 2023 Daytona 500, but rebounded with a second-place finish at Fontana a week later. On March 3, 2023, Xfinity Series driver Josh Berry was announced to drive the No. 9 as a substitute after Elliott sustained a fractured tibia from snowboarding in Colorado. On March 15, the No. 9 was served an L2 penalty after unapproved hood louvers were found installed on the car during pre-race inspection at Phoenix; as a result, the team was docked 100 driver and owner points and 10 playoff points. In addition, Gustafson was suspended for four races and fined 100,000. The penalty did not affect Elliott due to his injury while the substitute drivers of the No. 9 were ineligible for points.

Other racing
In 2021, Elliott debuted in the 24 Hours of Daytona, driving the No. 31 Cadillac for Action Express Racing alongside Mike Conway, Pipo Derani, and Felipe Nasr. The car started on the pole, but it suffered multiple mechanical problems that resulted in one of Elliott's stints taking place while the team was 22 laps behind the leader before retiring with four hours remaining due to a gear failure.

Elliott appeared in the Superstar Racing Experience's 2021 season finale at Nashville Fairgrounds Speedway. After starting fourth, he battled his father Bill for much of the second half before Chase cleared him and won; it was the second time the father and son raced against each other after first doing so at a late model race at South Alabama Speedway in 2013.

Elliott appeared in the Superstar Racing Experience's 2022 season finale at Sharon Speedway. After winning his 2nd heat race he would battle Tony Stewart for the win ultimately coming out the winner.

In popular culture

Television and film appearances
Elliott has made appearances on television, including CMT's The Dude Perfect Show. He voices the character Mark Set-Go on Nickelodeon's Blaze and the Monster Machines and Chase Racelott in the 2017 Pixar film Cars 3.

In 2017, Elliott served as a Fox NASCAR analyst for the Xfinity Series race at Atlanta.

In 2021, Elliott was the subject of a documentary with Dale Earnhardt Jr. called ‘Chase’ which talks about the story of his racing career.

Magazines
Elliott has appeared on the cover of magazines, including NASCAR Illustrated; NASCAR Pole Position; and Georgia Magazine.

Video games
Elliott is featured as a playable driver in Forza Motorsport 6, via the NASCAR expansion pack. The expansion features twenty-four paint schemes from the 2016 Sprint Cup Series season, including Elliott's No. 24 NAPA SS. Elliott, along with Jimmie Johnson and Kyle Busch, provide commentary in the expansion as the "voices of motorsport." Elliott and Johnson also had roles in developing the expansion.

Elliott has been a driver in all of the NASCAR Heat series of games by 704Games. All four 2018 HMS drivers, including Elliott, were on the cover of NASCAR Heat 3, which was released September 7, 2018. Elliott also appeared by himself on the cover for NASCAR Heat 5, which was released on July 10, 2020.

Appearing on the cover of a NASCAR game has led to what is called the “Cover Curse” leading to the driver having a wreck-filled terrible season, with bad luck and misfortune. Elliott is one of the few drivers to not have this happen to him. Appearing on the 2018 NASCAR Heat 3 cover, Elliott scored his first win in the Cup that year at Watkins Glen. In 2020 Elliott appeared on the cover of the standard edition of NASCAR Heat 5 and would go on to win the championship that season, Chase Elliott is also 1 of 3 drivers on the cover of NASCAR 21: Ignition.

Elliott is also featured on the cover of NASCAR Heat: Ultimate a Nintendo Switch title using NASCAR Heat 5 as the base, while adding the 2021 drivers and schemes.

Elliott is also in Nascar Rivals for the Nintendo Switch along with his car and 2022 paint schemes.

Motorsports career results

Career summary

NOTE:  The asterisk denotes Elliott won a Daytona 500 qualifying race, which counts as a stage win for championship purposes (ten points) but not a playoff point.

NASCAR
(key) (Bold – Pole position awarded by qualifying time. Italics – Pole position earned by points standings or practice time. * – Most laps led.)

Cup Series

Daytona 500

Xfinity Series

Craftsman Truck Series

K&N Pro Series East

K&N Pro Series West

 Season still in progress
 Ineligible for series points

ARCA Racing Series
(key) (Bold – Pole position awarded by qualifying time. Italics – Pole position earned by points standings or practice time. * – Most laps led.)

Complete WeatherTech SportsCar Championship results
(key) (Races in bold indicate pole position; races in italics indicate fastest lap)

24 Hours of Daytona results

Superstar Racing Experience
(key) * – Most laps led. 1 – Heat 1 winner.2 – Heat 2 winner.

See also
List of NASCAR Xfinity Series champions
List of people from Georgia (U.S. state)

References

Notes

Citations

External links

 
 

Living people
1995 births
People from Dawsonville, Georgia
Sportspeople from the Atlanta metropolitan area
Racing drivers from Georgia (U.S. state)
NASCAR drivers
ARCA Menards Series drivers
ARCA Midwest Tour drivers
CARS Tour drivers
NASCAR Xfinity Series champions
NASCAR Cup Series champions
3M people
WeatherTech SportsCar Championship drivers
24 Hours of Daytona drivers
JR Motorsports drivers
Hendrick Motorsports drivers
Action Express Racing drivers
NASCAR Cup Series regular season champions
Dreyer & Reinbold Racing drivers